Gotllieb Nakuta (born 8 May 1988) is a Namibian football (soccer) defender with Blue Waters F.C. and the Namibia national football team. He has 14 caps for Namibia and was on the squad which appeared at the 2008 Africa Cup of Nations, though he did not appear. He made his debut with Namibia in 2006 in a friendly against Zimbabwe.

References

1988 births
Living people
Namibian men's footballers
Namibia international footballers
2008 Africa Cup of Nations players
Association football defenders
Blue Waters F.C. players